The Supreme Council of Flanders and Burgundy (Consejo Supremo de Flandes y Borgoña (i.e. Flanders and Burgundy), or simply Consejo de Flandes) was a governing institution in the Spanish Empire responsible for advising the king of Spain on the exercise of his prerogatives in the Spanish Netherlands, particularly regarding ecclesiastical nominations, the appointment of high officials, royal pardons, and awards of honours such as knighthoods and noble titles.

History
The Supreme Council of Flanders was first founded in 1588, under Philip II of Spain, but was disbanded at his death, when the sovereignty of the Spanish Netherlands passed to Albert VII of Austria, ruling on behalf of his wife, the Infanta Isabella. The council was re-established in 1627 under Philip IV of Spain. It was finally abolished in 1702.

The institution's archives are in the Archivo General de Simancas.

Membership
When reinstituted in 1627, the council was intended to consist of six members assisted by two secretaries. Three of the members were to be jurists and three members of the high nobility, with at least one member to be a native of the Low Countries and one of the noblemen acting as president. The council was very seldom effectively at full strength.

President
 Diego Felipez de Guzmán, 1st Marquis of Leganés, 1628-1653
 Filippo Spinola, 2nd Marquis of the Balbases, 1653-1659
 Antonio Sancho Dávila de Toledo y Colonna, 1660-1666

Secretary
 Gabriel de Roy, knight, 1627-1645
 Jean Hernart, 1627-1631
 Juan Osvaldo de Brito, 1628-1637
 Jacques Brecht, 1638-1660
 Jean Vecquer, or Weckert, 1660-1673

Councillor
 Jean de Croÿ, Count of Solre, 1627-1640
 Pieter Roose, 1630-1632
 Jean de Gaverelles, 1633-1645
 Robert van Asseliers, 1639/40—1652 
 Antoon De Vulder, 1639/40-1644
 Antoine Brun, 1642-1654
 Michel de Coxie, knight, 1652-1660
 Boudewijn Van der Piet, 1652-1658
 Aurele Augustin Van Male, 1660-1662
 Charles de Watteville, 1660-1670
 Koenraad Van der Brughen, 1661-1662
 Jean-Antoine Locquet, 1663-1669
 Jean-Baptiste de Brouchoven, Count of Bergeyck, 1663-1681
 Simon de Fierlant, 1663-1668
 Esteban de Gamarra y Contreras, 1663-1671

References

1588 establishments in Europe
1627 establishments in Europe
1598 disestablishments in Europe
1702 disestablishments in Europe
Spanish Empire in Europe